Michalis Papazoglou was a Greek athlete from Constantinople. He started with track and field sports but when he came to Athens in the early 1910s, he joined the football club PPO (later to become PAO). He was the man who had the idea of adopting the trefoil as the official emblem of Panathinaikos. Beside football, he was also an athlete of discus throw and javelin throw.

Papazoglou was also a great figure in the National Resistance during World War II. He joined the resistance group of Jerzy Iwanow-Szajnowicz - an athlete of Polish origin of Iraklis Thessaloniki. The group's mission was to give information to the British and to organize sabotages. With some external help from the naval base, the group succeeded in destroying three German airplanes and sinking three small warships. He was arrested on 12 October 1942 and was transferred to the Averof Prison. He was tortured but finally managed to escape in September 1944.

People from Constantinople vilayet
Panathinaikos A.O.
Panathinaikos Athletics
Panathinaikos F.C. players
Panathinaikos F.C. non-playing staff
Greek footballers
Greek male discus throwers
Greek male javelin throwers
Greek Resistance members
Greek torture victims
Greek prisoners and detainees
Year of birth missing
Year of death missing
Association footballers not categorized by position
Constantinopolitan Greeks
Footballers from Istanbul